In mathematics, the vertical line test is a visual way to determine if a curve is a graph of a function or not. A function can only have one output, y, for each unique input, x. If a vertical line intersects a curve on an xy-plane more than once then for one value of x the curve has more than one value of y, and so, the curve does not represent a function. If all vertical lines intersect a curve at most once then the curve represents a function.

See also
Horizontal line test

Notes

Functions and mappings